Amorina may refer to:
 Amorina (film), a 1961 Argentine musical film
 Amorina (ammonite), a genus of ammonites
 Amorina (ship), a Swedish ship
 Amorina, an 1822 novel by Swedish author Carl Jonas Love Almqvist
 Henos Amorina, a former leader of the metalworkers of Osasco and a founding member of the Workers' Party of Brazil

See also
 Amorini (disambiguation)
 Amorino (disambiguation)